Pakistani Australians are Australians who are of Pakistani descent or heritage. Most Pakistani Australians are Muslims by religion, although there are also sizeable Christian, Hindu and other minorities.

History in Australia

An anthropological study by the Max Planck Institute for Evolutionary Anthropology found a genetic pattern (SNP) among Aboriginal Australians which is also present among some Dravidian speakers native to the Indian subcontinent. According to the study, the migration of these genes from the subcontinent to Australia may have occurred well over 4,200 years ago at around 2217 BC, roughly the same period when the Indus Valley civilisation (IVC) was emerging. Although the IVC did not extend to the southern part of the Indian subcontinent where this SNP is predominantly found, it is a commonly held view that the Dravidians were "once more widespread than they are today." The Indus Valley states extensively used seafaring ships to trade with their West Asian neighbours, and it is believed that these may have facilitated the means to get to Australia. These early settlers were assimilated into the local population.

Early Muslim migrants (known as "Ghans") entered Outback Australia as camel drivers in the late 1800s from Colonial India and some of those areas are now part of present-day Pakistan. Many of these men were unmarried, and intermarried with local Aboriginal women, resulting in a mixed Aboriginal Australian population with ancestry in Pakistan.

Immigration from lands that make up the historical territory of Pakistan to Australia has been occurring since the late 19 century.  In the modern sense, Pakistan came into existence in 1947 as a result of the dissolution of the British Raj via the Partition of India.  In the modern post-independence sense,  Pakistani migrants can be dated back to the early 1950s, Immigration to Australia from Pakistan started to pick up in the 1970s. Since then the number of Pakistani immigrants increased dramatically, with thousands of Pakistanis entering Australia each year since that time.

Demographics
Figures from the Australian Bureau of Statistics for 2011 indicated that there were about 33,049 Pakistani Australians, of whom 30,221 were born in Pakistan. By mid-2014, the number of Pakistani-born individuals stood at 49,770. At the time of the 2016 census, the total population reached 61,913 individuals. The Pakistani community is the second fastest-growing in terms of population growth. Pakistanis are also the largest contributor of overseas-born Muslims in Australia, at 14.7 percent. Urdu is one of the most common languages in Pakistani households, and Sydney has the largest Pakistani community in Oceania. In June 2017, 76,590 Pakistani-born individuals were living in Australia. As of June 2018, the population was recorded at 84,340 by the ABS. In 2019, the population grew by eight percent to 91,000.

According to the 2006 Census in Victoria, there were an estimated 4,703 Pakistani born persons, with the majority living in Melbourne. The number has since tripled from the previous census which was in 1996. Those living in Victoria that are Pakistani-born are highly educated with more than a third working in professional positions and about half working in 'clerical, production, service, transport and sales positions'.

In 2012, 7,400 Pakistani international students were studying in Australia, an increase from close to 5,000 in 2007. Under the Australia-Pakistan Scholarship Program, 500 scholarships were available to Pakistani students from 2005 to 2010 to facilitate postgraduate studies in Australia. Australia has become one of the largest markets for Pakistani students outside the United States and United Kingdom.

Around 1,000 Pakistanis live in the federal capital, Canberra.

Education and qualifications
Pakistani Australians tend to be urban, well-educated, and professional. Most of them migrate from large cities like Karachi, Lahore, Islamabad, Rawalpindi, Hyderabad, Multan and Peshawar, and tend to be familiar with Western culture and ways of living. According to the Department of Immigration and Border Protection, around 50 percent of Pakistani-born Australians hold an undergraduate degree or higher qualification, compared to the national average of 20 percent. Similarly, 52 percent of Pakistanis fall within the age bracket of 22 to 44 years. Occupationally, 29 percent of Pakistanis are employed as professionals, 10 percent are in managerial roles, 12 percent are involved in clerical and administration roles, another 12 percent are involved in community work and personal services, nine percent are sales workers, while 13 percent are drivers/machine operators, 8 percent are labourers and 7 percent are tradespeople.

Notable people

See also 

 Australia–Pakistan relations
 Australians in Pakistan
 Indian Australian
 Bangladeshi Australian
 Punjabi Australians
 Hazara Australians

References

External links
 High Commission For Pakistan
 Pakistan Cultural Association
 Pakistan Australia Friendship Association

Asian Australian
Immigration to Australia